Elections in the Republic of India in 1979 included elections to two state legislative assemblies, elections to the Indian Rajya Sabha and for the post of the vice-president.

Legislative Assembly elections

Mizoram

Sikkim

Rajya Sabha elections

Source:

Vice-presidential election

The 1979 Indian vice presidential election was not needed as former Chief Justice Mohammad Hidayatullah was elected unopposed for the post.

References

External links
 

1979 elections in India
India
1979 in India
Elections in India by year